The 2004–05 season was the 119th season in the history of Luton Town Football Club, and club's 84th consecutive year in the Football League. Luton ended the season as champions of the rebranded League One competition, formerly known as the Second Division, with 98 points, achieving promotion to the Championship; the club's first elevation to that level since the 1981–82 season.

The club spent very little money bringing in new players to win the title, instead relying on existing players, use of the loan system and the robust youth set-up. Much of the success was built on a strong defence, headed by youth graduate Curtis Davies, which let in the fewest goals of any team; the leadership of combative midfielder and captain Kevin Nicholls, who unlike in previous years remained uninjured for the whole season; and the team's ability to score late goals – of the 87 goals the team scored in the league, almost a fifth came in the last ten minutes of matches.

This article covers the period from 1 July 2004 to 30 June 2005.

Background

With Luton Town losing up to £500,000 per month and the very real threat of its history and heritage being destroyed by controversial owner John Gurney, supporters' trust Trust in Luton deliberately placed the club into administrative receivership in July 2003 after taking a controlling interest in the club's major creditor. Gurney was successfully forced out as a result, but administration meant that the club was unable to sign players without special dispensation from the authorities during the 2003–04 season and, therefore, a finish of tenth place in the league was viewed by many to be a success.

On 12 May 2004, four days after the last game of the campaign, businessman Bill Tomlins completed his takeover of the club, securing its immediate future. Manager Mike Newell began the process of keeping key players, committing defenders Chris Coyne and Russell Perrett, midfielders Paul Hughes, Michael Leary and Steve Robinson, and youth players Curtis Davies, Rob Beckwith and Stephen O'Leary to two-year contracts, as well as rejecting an offer from Sheffield Wednesday for leading scorer Steve Howard. Popular striker Adrian Forbes left the club and dropped down to the league below, signing for Swansea City on a free transfer in late June.

Review

July
Experienced goalkeeper Marlon Beresford returned to Luton, where he had spent three months during the previous season, on a free transfer on 1 July from Barnsley. The same day, midfielder Matthew Spring, who had started his career at Luton and made nearly 300 appearances for the team, joined Championship club Leeds United on a Bosman free transfer. On 12 July 2003–04 Player of the Year Emmerson Boyce, another who had graduated through the youth system, turned down the offer of a new contract and joined Premier League club Crystal Palace on a free transfer. The club signed Slovenian goalkeeper Dino Seremet on a two-year contract on 23 July from NK Maribor, the player arriving on a free transfer following a successful trial period.

After five friendly victories against local sides, Luton were brought back to earth with a 4–0 home loss to Dutch champions and former European Cup winners Ajax on 23 July. Striker Matthew Blinkhorn joined Luton on a three-month loan from Blackpool a week later.

A 1–1 draw with Premier League club Charlton Athletic on 31 July rounded off pre-season, with the first league game of the campaign beginning a week later.

August
A day before the first game with Oldham Athletic, Luton signed Portsmouth's 21-year-old striker Rowan Vine on a three-month loan, with a view to extending this for the whole season. Vine started in the team that beat Oldham 2–1 on 7 August, with goals from Steve Howard and Paul Underwood resulting in a Luton victory in an otherwise even game. Narrow, albeit high-scoring, victories away to Swindon Town and Barnsley pushed Luton into second place in the table, and marked the first time since the 1981–82 season that the club had won their first three games of a campaign.

The team kept their first clean sheet with a 1–0 win over Torquay United on 21 August that pushed them into first place. A week later, Luton won 3–1 away to Blackpool in a game they dominated, scoring three goals in the second half to win their third away game – the same number of away wins achieved in the entirety of the previous season. Howard scored again to make it five goals in five League One games and, including the previous season, ten goals in ten consecutive games. A 1–0 home win against AFC Bournemouth two days later, captain Kevin Nicholls scoring the winning goal late on with a 25-yard curling shot, gave Luton a six-point lead at the top of the table.

These six wins in a row saw Mike Newell presented with the Manager of the Month award, and Steve Howard awarded the Player of the Month trophy for his five goals.

September
Youth player Keith Keane, who had played a number of games in August in place of the injured Kevin Foley, was rewarded for his performances with a two-year professional contract on 3 September. Soon after, on-loan striker Rowan Vine extended his loan until the end of the season following a strong start.

Luton's 100% record came to an end on 4 September when they drew 0–0 at Sheffield Wednesday. Three days later, the club was knocked out of the League Cup after a 4–3 extra time loss to League Two club Boston United.

Luton clearly did not dwell on either of these setbacks, winning their next three league games to extend the gap to second-placed Tranmere Rovers to nine points. In this period, the club signed striker Gary McSheffrey on a one-month loan, a player who had proved a success in a three-month loan spell the previous season. First-choice goalkeeper Marlon Beresford was injured in a 2–1 home win against Peterborough United, meaning back-up Dino Seremet made his debut as a substitute. Seremet's first start did not go so well, as Luton were knocked out of the Football League Trophy, again by lower league opposition, in a 2–0 loss to Swansea City on 28 September. Youth players Calvin Andrew and Leon Barnett both signed three-year professional contracts the same day.

A Luton player won the League One Player of the Month award for the second month in a row, Rowan Vine picking up the award after scoring three goals in four league games.

October
A 1–1 draw away to closest rivals Tranmere Rovers on 2 October was described as "the toughest test for [the team] yet" by Mike Newell. Following a 3–0 win against Hartlepool United six days later, the club had gone over a quarter of the league season unbeaten.

This record quickly evaporated with three defeats in a row, to Huddersfield Town, Walsall, and a heavy 3–0 loss against Hull City, who had now overtaken Tranmere as Luton's nearest rivals. Newell refused to be flustered despite dropping nine points, stating that "there isn't a lot wrong" and that bad luck had played a part in the defeats.

The injury to Marlon Beresford and poor goalkeeping performances from Dino Seremet led Luton to sign Simon Royce on a one-month loan from Charlton Athletic on 29 October. A 4–0 home win against Bradford City came one day later, with Ahmet Brković opening the scoring with a "sensational" bicycle kick.

November
Director of Football Mick Harford left the club on 5 November to take up the post of assistant manager at Nottingham Forest.

The club remained unbeaten throughout November, winning convincingly against Wrexham and Milton Keynes Dons, drawing against Doncaster Rovers, and claiming an FA Cup first round victory over Southend United.

Luton rejected a bid for Steve Howard during November from Championship club Nottingham Forest, managed by former Luton boss Joe Kinnear. Leon Barnett, who had graduated through the youth team, signed for non-League Aylesbury United on loan for a month on 19 November.

Central defender Curtis Davies became the third Luton player in four months to win the League One Player of the Month award for his performances in November.

December
Luton secured a place in the FA Cup third round following a 3–0 win away to Wycombe Wanderers on 4 December.

Steve Howard was sent off early in Luton's game at Brentford on 7 December, with the club losing 2–0 in their fourth league defeat of the season and reducing their lead at the top of the table to just one point. However, wins against Port Vale, Bristol City, and Chesterfield allowed Luton to pull out a lead once again. The performances of squad players such as Russell Perrett and Enoch Showunmi, filling in for injuries and suspensions, were cited by Mike Newell as key to these three victories.

On 16 December, defenders David Bayliss and Ian Hillier both joined League Two club Chester City on one-month loans.

2004 ended in a 2–2 home draw with Colchester United, Rowan Vine scoring twice.

January
Two draws in the league saw Luton usurped as league leaders by Hull City, marking the first time during the season that they had been in a place other than top since 28 August. Luton were then knocked out of the FA Cup with a 2–0 home defeat to Brentford on 8 January.

The loans of David Bayliss and Ian Hillier at Chester City were both extended for a further month on 14 January.

The club returned to the top of the table with their first win in four games, beating bottom-of-the-table Stockport County 3–0 on 15 January. Further draws with Colchester United and Tranmere Rovers still left Luton as leaders, as Hull began to drop points.

February
Left-back Sol Davis signed a one-year contract extension on 3 February.

On 5 February, Luton drew for the third time in a row, this time with Huddersfield Town, conceding in the fourth minute of added time. A draw for Hull left them one point behind Luton in the table, with the next match taking place between the two sides at Kenilworth Road one week later. A close match was eventually won by Luton, Ahmet Brković scoring in the last minute of the game to pull out a four-point lead.

Three further wins in quick succession over Hartlepool United, Bradford City and Walsall saw this four-point gap increase to nine, and even a loss to Port Vale in late February, described by Newell as their "worst performance of the season", that ended a 14-game unbeaten league run kept Luton comfortably in first place.

March
Luton put the defeat to Port Vale behind them with a 5–0 thrashing of Bristol City and then a 3–1 win over Swindon Town.

Influential midfielders Kevin Nicholls and Ahmet Brković both signed one-year contract extensions on 3 March. On 10 March, manager Mike Newell signed a two-year contract extension alongside his assistant manager Brian Stein. Young goalkeeper Dean Brill signed a one-year contract extension on 14 March. Two days later, Wycombe Wanderers rejected a £100,000 bid from Luton for their top scorer Nathan Tyson.

The club drew 2–2 with Oldham Athletic on 19 March, with a last-minute Steve Howard goal earning a point that saw Hull City close the gap to the top.

Northern Ireland international striker Warren Feeney signed for Luton on 24 March for a £150,000 fee from Stockport County, where he had scored 17 goals. A 3–1 defeat the next day to Barnsley, coupled with a draw for Hull, meant Luton conceded top place in the table again, though both clubs were still safely above the play-off places. A 4–1 win over Torquay United on 28 March, along with Hull losing, lifted Luton back into first.

April
Luton went the entirety of April without losing or drawing, with consecutive victories against Blackpool, Bournemouth, Milton Keynes Dons, Wrexham and Brentford securing promotion to the Championship and first place in the table; the club's first promotion to the second tier of English football since the 1981–82 season.

Chris Coyne was awarded the Player of the Month trophy for April, making him the fourth Luton player in nine months to win the accolade, while Mike Newell won the Manager of the Month award for the second time during the season.

May and June
Luton ended the season with an incident-packed 3–3 draw with Doncaster Rovers on 7 May.

The club had six players named in the League One Team of the Year – goalkeeper Marlon Beresford; centre-backs Curtis Davies and Chris Coyne; midfielders Kevin Nicholls and Ahmet Brković; and top scorer Steve Howard. Curtis Davies was also named as the overall League One Player of the Year, a notable achievement considering this was the 20-year-old's first full season.

On 17 May, it was announced that Wrexham's Trinidadian international winger Carlos Edwards would join Luton on a free transfer on 1 July 2005, signing a three-year contract. Lee Mansell, who had played only three times during the season, joined Oxford United on a free transfer on 7 June. Steve Howard, who had been the subject of bids from Sheffield Wednesday, Nottingham Forest and Burnley throughout the season, committed himself to Luton on 16 June by signing a new two-year contract. Midfielder Peter Holmes also agreed a one-year extension to his contract. On 30 June, defender David Bayliss left Luton to join Wrexham.

Match results

Luton Town results given first.

Legend

Friendlies

League One

All results, goals, attendances etc. taken from Soccerbase and verified with official Luton Town match reports.

FA Cup

Football League Cup

Football League Trophy

League table

Player statistics
Last match played on 7 May 2005. Players with a zero in every column appeared either as unused substitutes or were assigned squad numbers.

Managerial statistics

Only competitive games from the 2004–05 season are included.

Awards

Awarded on 2 May 2005.

Transfers

In

Out

Loans in

Loans out

See also
List of Luton Town F.C. seasons

Footnotes

A.  The goal of the season was awarded to Ahmet Brković for his bicycle kick against Bradford City on 30 October 2004.

References

Luton Town F.C. seasons
Luton Town